Santa Maria Maggiore, called the basilica vetus (old basilica) or basilica minor (minor basilica), was a church in Milan, established in 313, which served as co-cathedral alongside Santa Tecla until it was torn down after 1386 to make room for the modern cathedral. It served as the winter cathedral, while Santa Tecla was that of the summer.

See also
 Early Christian churches in Milan

313 establishments
Basilica churches in Milan
4th-century establishments in Italy